In chemistry, a reaction intermediate or an intermediate is a molecular entity that is formed from the reactants (or preceding intermediates) but is consumed in further reactions in stepwise chemical reactions that contain multiple elementary steps. Intermediates are the reaction product of one elementary step, but do not appear in the chemical equation for an overall chemical equation.

For example, consider this hypothetical stepwise reaction:
A + B -> C + D
The reaction includes two elementary steps:
A + B -> X
X -> C + D
In this example, X is a reaction intermediate.

IUPAC definition
The IUPAC Gold Book defines an intermediate as a compound that has a lifetime greater than a molecular vibration that is formed (directly or indirectly) from the reactants and reacts further to give (either directly or indirectly) the products of a chemical reaction. The lifetime condition distinguishes true, chemically distinct intermediates from vibrational states or such transition states which, by definition have lifetimes close to that of molecular vibration.

Kinetically, intermediates are often consumed quickly in a step-wise mechanism. The designation of "fast" or "slow" consumption speed is relative, and a relative intermediate are sometimes separated from a reaction intermediate based on being relatively short-lived. Reactive intermediates are an unstable type of reaction intermediate, and are usually short-lived, high-energy, and seldom isolated. They do not remain in the product mixture due to their short lifetime, in contrast to other reaction intermediates.

Common reaction intermediates

Carbocations 
Cations, often carbocations, serve as intermediates in various types of reactions to synthesize new compounds.

Carbocation intermediates in alkene addition 
Carbocations are formed in two major alkene addition reactions. In a HX addition reaction, the pi bond of an alkene acts as a nucleophile and bonds with the proton of an HX molecule, where the X is a halogen atom. This forms a carbocation intermediate, and the X bonds to the positive carbon that is available, as in the example reaction shown below.

CH2CH2 + HX → CH2CH3+ + X-

CH2CH3+ +  X- → CH2XCH3

Similarly, in a H2O addition reaction, the pi bond of an alkene acts as a nucleophile and bonds with the proton of a H3O+ molecule. This forms a carbocation intermediate, and then, the oxygen atom of H2O bonds with the positive carbon of the intermediate. The oxygen finally deprotonates to form a final alcohol product, as shown below.

CH2CH2 + H3O+ → CH2CH3+ + H2O

CH2CH3+ +  H2O → CH2OH2CH3+

CH2OH2CH3+  +  H2O → CH2OHCH3 +H3O+

Carbocation intermediates in nucleophilic substitution 
Nucleophilic substitution reactions occur when a nucleophilic molecule attacks a positive or partially positive electrophilic center by breaking and creating a new bond. SN1 and SN2 are two different mechanisms for nucleophilic substitution, and SN1 involves a carbocation intermediate. In SN1, A leaving group is broken off to create a carbocation reaction intermediate. Then, a nucleophile attacks and forms a new bond with the carbocation intermediate to form the final, substituted product, as shown in the reaction of 2-bromo-2-methylpropane to form 2-methyl-2-propanol.

(CH3)3CBr → (CH3)3C+

(CH3)3C+ + H2O → (CH3)3OH2+

(CH3)3OH2+ → (CH3)3OH + H+

In this reaction, (CH3)3C+ is the formed carbocation intermediate to form the alcohol product.

Carbocation intermediates in elimination reactions 

β-elimination or elimination reactions occur through the loss of a substituent leaving group and loss of a proton to form a pi bond. E1 and E2 are two different mechanisms for elimination reactions, and E1 involves a carbocation intermediate. In E1, a leaving group detaches from a carbon to form a carbocation reaction intermediate. Then, a solvent removes a proton, but the electrons used to form the proton bond form a pi bond, as shown in the pictured reaction on the right.

Carbanions 
A carbanion is a organic molecule where a carbon atom is not electron deficient but contain an overall negative charge. Carbanions are strong nucleophiles, which can be used to extend an alkene's carbon backbone in the synthesis reaction shown below.

C2H2 with NaNH2 in NH3 (l) → CHC-

CHC- + BrCH2CH3 → CHCCH2CH3

The alkyne carbanion, CHC-, is a reaction intermediate in this reaction.

Radicals 
Radicals are highly reactive and short-lived, as they have an unpaired electron which makes it extremely unstable. Radicals often react with hydrogens attached carbon molecules, effectively making the carbon a radical while stabilizing the former radical in a process called propagation. The formed product, a carbon radical, can react with non-radical molecule to continue propagation or react with another radical to form a new stable molecule such as a longer carbon chain or an alkyl halide.

The example below of methane chlorination shows a multi-step reaction involving radicals.

Methane chlorination 
Methane chlorination is a chain reaction. If only the products and reactants are analyzed, the result is:

 CH4 + 4Cl2->CCl4 +4HCl 

However, this reaction has 3 intermediate reactants which are formed during a sequence of 4 irreversible second order reactions until we arrive at the final product. This is why it's called  a chain reaction. Following only the carbon containing species in series:

 CH4 -> CH3Cl -> CH2Cl2 -> CHCl3 -> CCl4 

Reactants:  CH4 + 4Cl2 

Products:  CCl4 + 4HCl 

The other species are reaction intermediates:  CH3Cl, CH2Cl2, CHCl3 

These are the set of irreversible second-order reactions:

 CH4 + Cl2->CH3Cl + HCl 

 CH3Cl + Cl2->CH2Cl2 + HCl 

 CH2Cl2 + Cl2->CHCl3 + HCl 

 CHCl3 + Cl2->CCl4 + HCl 

These intermediate species’ concentrations can be calculated by integrating the system of kinetic equations. The full reaction is a free radical propagation reaction which is filled out in detail below.

Initiation: This reaction can occur by thermolysis (heating) or photolysis (absorption of light) leading to the breakage of a molecular chlorine bond.
 Cl-Cl ->[h \nu] Cl. + Cl. 

When the bond is broken it produces two highly reactive chlorine atoms.

Propagation: This stage has two distinct reaction classes. The first is the stripping of a hydrogen from the carbon species by the chlorine radicals. This occurs because chlorine atoms alone are unstable, and these chlorine atoms react with one the carbon species' hydrogens. The result is the formation of hydrochloric acid and a new radical methyl group.

 CH3-H + Cl. -> CH3. + H-Cl 

 CH2Cl-H + Cl. -> CH2Cl. + H-Cl 

 CHCl2-H + Cl. -> CHCl2. + H-Cl 

 CCl3-H + Cl. -> CCl3. + H-Cl 

These new radical carbon containing species now react with a second Cl2 molecule. This regenerates the chlorine radical and the cycle continues. This reaction occurs because while the radical methyl species are more stable than the radical chlorines, the overall stability of the newly formed chloromethane species more than makes up the energy difference.

 CH3. + Cl-Cl -> CH3Cl + Cl. 

 CH2Cl. + Cl-Cl -> CH2Cl2 + Cl. 

 CHCl2. + Cl-Cl -> CHCl3 + Cl. 

 CCl3. + Cl-Cl -> CCl4 + Cl. 

During the propagation of the reaction, there are several highly reactive species that will be removed and stabilized at the termination step.

Termination: This kind of reaction takes place when the radical species interact directly. The products of the termination reactions are typically very low yield in comparison to the main products or intermediates as the highly reactive radical species are in relatively low concentration in relation to the rest of the mixture. This kind of reaction produces stable side products, reactants, or intermediates and slows the propagation reaction by lowering the number of radicals available to propagate the chain reaction.

There are many different termination combinations, some examples are:

Union of methyl radicals from a C-C bond leading to ethane (a side product).

 CH3. + CH3. -> CH3-CH3 

Union of one methyl radical to a Cl radical forming chloromethane (another reaction forming an intermediate).

 CH3. + Cl. -> CH3Cl 

Union of two Cl radicals to reform chlorine gas (a reaction reforming a reactant).

 Cl. + Cl. -> Cl2

Applications

Biological intermediates 
Reaction intermediates serve purposes in a variety of biological settings. An example of this is demonstrated with the enzyme reaction intermediate of metallo-β-lactamase, which bacteria can use to acquire resistance to commonly used antibiotics such as penicillin. Metallo-β-lactamase can catalyze β-lactams, a family of common antibiotics. Spectroscopy techniques have found that the reaction intermediate of metallo-β-lactamase uses zinc in the resistance pathway.

Another example of the importance of reaction intermediates is seen with AAA-ATPase p97, a protein that used in a variety of cellular metabolic processes. p97 is also linked to degenerative disease and cancer. In a study looking at reaction intermediates of the AAA-ATPase p97 function found an important ADP.Pi nucleotide intermediate is important in the p97 molecular operation.

An additional example of biologically relevant reaction intermediates can be found with the RCL enzymes, which catalyzes glycosidic bonds. When studied using methanolysis, it was found that the reaction required the formation of a reaction intermediate.

Chemical processing industry 
In the chemical industry, the term intermediate may also refer to the (stable) product of a reaction that is itself valuable only as a precursor chemical for other industries. A common example is cumene which is made from benzene and propylene and used to make acetone and phenol in the cumene process. The cumene itself is of relatively little value in and of itself, and is typically only bought and sold by chemical companies.

See also
 Activated complex

References

Chemical kinetics
Chemical reactions